Andy Murray's 2017 tennis season officially began at the Qatar Open.

Year summary

Australian Open and early hard court season

Exhibitions and Qatar Open
Prior to the Qatar Open, Murray played in the exhibition Mubadala World Tennis Championship, where he lost in the semi-finals to David Goffin before beating Milos Raonic in the third-place play-off. This event occurred prior to the 2017 season (December 29–31st)

Murray competed at the Qatar Open for the first time since 2014, when he lost in the second round. He competed in the tournament as the top seed, entering the tournament on a 24-match win streak. He extended that streak with a first round win against Jérémy Chardy, a second round win against Gerald Melzer, and a quarterfinal win against Nicolás Almagro. In the semi-final he beat Tomáš Berdych (Murray's hundredth career win against a top ten opponent) in straight sets. Murray lost in the final against Novak Djokovic in three sets, to make their head-to-head record 25–11 in favor of Djokovic. Murray saved three championship points in the second set, but was not able to win the decider.

Australian Open
Murray entered the Australian Open as the top seed, and began his campaign for a first title in Melbourne with straight-set wins over Illya Marchenko, Andrey Rublev, and Sam Querrey. Murray was then stunned by Mischa Zverev in four sets. Throughout the match, Zverev used aggressive tactics and a serve-and-volley style of play to bamboozle Murray.

Dubai Tennis Championships
Murray's next tournament was the Dubai Open. After straight-set wins over Malek Jaziri and Guillermo Garcia-Lopez, Murray won a thrilling three-set match against Phillipp Kohlschreiber, saving seven match points in a second-set tiebreak he eventually won 20–18. Murray followed this up with a victory against Lucas Pouille to reach the final, where he beat Fernando Verdasco in straight sets to win a first Dubai title.

Indian Wells Masters
Upon entering Indian Wells, Murray was stunned by world No. 129 Vasek Pospisil in straight sets.

European clay court season and French Open

Monte-Carlo Masters
After missing a month due to an elbow injury, Murray competed in the Monte-Carlo Masters where he received a bye in the first round before defeating Gilles Müller in straight sets. Murray was then upset by world No. 24 Albert Ramos Viñolas in the next round despite having a 4–0 lead in the third set.

Barcelona Open
In the Barcelona Open, Murray advanced to the quarterfinals after a walkover over Bernard Tomic and a straight sets victory over Feliciano López. He then defeated Albert Ramos Viñolas in three sets, rebounding from his defeat in the Monte-Carlo Masters, but lost in the semifinals to Dominic Thiem in three sets.

Madrid Open
Murray then competed at the Madrid Open where he defeated Marius Copil in straight sets in the second round but lost in the third round to Borna Coric in straight sets.

Italian Open
Murray was the defending champion at the Italian Open however his title defense ended in a straight sets defeat against Fabio Fognini.

French Open
In the French Open, Murray defeated Andrey Kuznetsov and Martin Klizan in four sets before defeating Juan Martin del Potro and Karen Khachanov in straight sets to reach the quarterfinals. He then defeated Kei Nishikori in four sets to reach the semifinals where he lost to eventual finalist Stan Wawrinka in five sets.

Grass Court Season

Queen's Club Championships
Murray then played at the Queen's Club Championships where he was the two-time defending champion, however he lost in the first round to Jordan Thompson in straight sets.

Wimbledon Championships
Murray then entered the Wimbledon Championships as the defending champion, despite sustaining a lingering hip injury beforehand. He defeated Alexander Bublik and Dustin Brown in straight sets to reach the third round. He then defeated Fabio Fognini in four sets and Benoît Paire in straight sets to progress into the quarterfinals. He then lost to Sam Querrey in five sets.

Hip injury and end of Season
The loss to Sam Querrey in the Wimbledon quarterfinals officially ended Murray's 2017 tennis season as Murray was forced to withdraw from all the following tournaments as a result of his hip injury, despite attempting to participate at the US Open. As a result, he did not qualify for the ATP Finals and his world ranking fell to World No. 16, his lowest ranking since May 2008. Despite not playing in an official tournament again in 2017, he returned to the court to play a charity match against Roger Federer in Glasgow.

All matches
This table chronicles all the matches of Andy Murray in 2017, including walkovers (W/O) which the ATP does not count as wins. They are marked ND for non-decision or no decision.

Singles

Doubles

Exhibitions

Tournament schedule

Singles schedule

Yearly records

Head-to-head matchups
Andy Murray had a  match win–loss record in the 2017 season. The following list is ordered by number of wins:
(Bold denotes a top 10 player at the time of the most recent match between the two players, Italic denotes top 50.)

 Jérémy Chardy 1–0
 Gerald Melzer 1–0
 Nicolás Almagro 1–0
 Tomáš Berdych 1–0
 Illya Marchenko 1–0
 Andrey Rublev 1–0
 Malek Jaziri 1–0
 Guillermo García López 1–0
 Philipp Kohlschreiber 1–0
 Lucas Pouille 1–0
 Fernando Verdasco 1–0
 Gilles Müller 1–0
 Feliciano López 1–0
 Marius Copil 1–0
 Andrey Kuznetsov 1–0
 Martin Kližan 1–0
 Juan Martín del Potro 1–0
 Karen Khachanov 1–0
 Kei Nishikori 1–0
 Alexander Bublik 1–0
 Dustin Brown 1–0
 Benoît Paire 1–0
 Albert Ramos Viñolas 1–1
 Fabio Fognini 1–1
 Sam Querrey 1–1
 Novak Djokovic 0–1
 Mischa Zverev 0–1
 Vasek Pospisil 0–1
 Dominic Thiem 0–1
 Borna Ćorić 0–1
 Stan Wawrinka 0–1
 Jordan Thompson 0–1

Finals

Singles: 2 (1–1)

Earnings

 Figures in United States dollars (USD) unless noted. 

 Bold denotes tournament win

See also
 2017 ATP World Tour
 2017 Novak Djokovic tennis season
 2017 Roger Federer tennis season
 2017 Rafael Nadal tennis season
 2017 Stan Wawrinka tennis season

References

External links
 
2017 Schedule at ATP World Tour

Murray
Murray
Murray